Suhas Palshikar is an Indian academic and social and political scientist. He taught political science at Savitribai Phule Pune University, Pune,  and is chief editor of Studies in Indian Politics. He is also co director of Lokniti Programme on Comparative Democracy, CSDS.

Career
He taught at the S P College, Pune for eleven years from 1978 to 1989. He is co director of Lokniti, CSDS and was Professor in the Department of Politics and Public Administration at the Savitribai Phule Pune University from 1989 to 2016. He is also the Chief Editor of the journal Studies in Indian Politics.  He specialised in the areas of Political Process in India, Politics of Maharashtra, Political Sociology of Democracy.

Research projects

 2000 - Politics of Marginalized Groups: A Study of Aurangabad and Ahmednagar districts
 2011 - Electoral Democracy and structures of Domination: A Study of Assembly Elections in Maharashtra

References

Living people
Year of birth missing (living people)
Academic staff of Savitribai Phule Pune University
Indian political scientists